NGC 1003 is a spiral galaxy at the western edge of the Perseus constellation. This galaxy was discovered by the Anglo-German astronomer William Herschel on October 6, 1784, who described it as "pretty faint, large, extended 90°±, much brighter middle, mottled but not resolved". It is a member of the NGC 1023 group of galaxies.

The morphological class of NGC 1003 is SAcd, which means it is an unbarred spiral galaxy (SA) with somewhat loosely-wound spiral arms (cd). It is inclined by an angle of 70° to the line of sight from the Earth, with the major axis aligned along a position angle of 276°. The visual disk of the galaxy shows a substantial warping in the eastern side, turning it almost face on. The estimated star formation rate is ·yr−1.

A type Ia supernova was discovered in the galaxy by F. Zwicky in 1937, and subsequently designated SN 1937D.

Gallery

References

External links

 

1003
Perseus (constellation)
Unbarred spiral galaxies
010052